Coal Lake is a lake in Todd County, in the U.S. state of Minnesota.

Coal Lake was named after nearby deposits of lignite coal.

See also
List of lakes in Minnesota

References

Lakes of Minnesota
Lakes of Todd County, Minnesota